An exam invigilator, exam proctor or exam supervisor is someone appointed by an educational institution or an examination board to maintain proper conduct in a particular examination in accordance with exam regulations. Typically, the main duty of an exam invigilator is to watch examination candidates to prevent cheating. The purpose of exam invigilating is to ensure each candidate sits the examination under equal conditions.

Exam invigilators are appointed to a position of trust and are expected to possess integrity and vigilance to conduct examinations in exact accordance with the board’s instructions.

Purpose
The purpose of exam invigilation is to ensure that all candidates are under active surveillance for every moment of the duration of the examination. Invigilators should also try to provide a suitably pleasant and supportive atmosphere for candidates. However, they must also ensure and prevent any kind of communication between candidates (by copying, whispering or any kind of signal, exchange of paper or objects) and any kind of access to books, papers or electronic media of any kind (unless specifically authorized) for the exam duration.

Invigilators also need to ensure the security of the examination hall before, during and after the examination. From the moment the question papers are given out until all answers are collected, exam invigilators should patrol vigilantly. Particular emphasis should be given to multiple-choice and short-answer questions. The main goal should be to prevent possible candidate malpractice and administrative failures.

The minimum number of invigilators required for different kinds of examinations depends on the type of examinations held.  For general written examinations, there should be at least one invigilator present against every 30 students for patrolling and vigilance at the examination hall.

Duties

General duties 
The main duty of an exam invigilator is to support the Chief Invigilator, the Deputy Chief Invigilator, the Examinations Officer and the other invigilators at the examination venue.

Some of the other general duties may include:

 Setting up the examination venues by placing candidate numbers, booklets, examination papers, stationery and equipment at desks in accordance with strict procedures.
 Implementing the exam rules and regulations and remaining vigilant throughout the examination duration.
 Assisting the candidates before, during and after the examination by directing them to their seats, advising them about possessions permitted at examination venues and dealing with queries raised by candidates etc.
 Invigilating carefully, making sure that candidates do not talk inside examination venues and also responding to any examination irregularities immediately.
 Checking attendance during examinations, recording details of late arrivals and ensuring that proper seating plans are followed.
 Escorting candidates during water breaks or washroom breaks as required and detecting any unauthorized materials inside the examination hall.
 Delivering and collecting scripts carefully at the start and end of the examination in accordance with strict examination procedures.
 Assisting with the packing of examination scripts, stationery and other equipment from the examination venues.
 Supervising candidates in leaving the examination venues in a quiet and disciplined manner and ensuring that candidates do not remove equipment or stationery from the examination venue without the permission of the authority.

Before the exam
Before the start of the examination, exam invigilators must be fully briefed and trained before carrying out the task of invigilation in their respective venues. It is essential that exam invigilators familiarize themselves with the appropriate examination regulations and procedures before attending the examination hall.

Exam invigilators should arrive at the examination hall at least one hour before the start of the examination to report for their duty and remain for an additional hour after the exams to collect and wrap up the examination scripts.

Before the candidates arrive, exam invigilators must prepare the examination venue by placing the required answer booklets, reference booklets, candidate numbers and other supplementary materials on candidates' desks. They must make sure that the time of the clock at the examination venue is set correctly and necessary instructions are clearly displayed at the front of the examination hall for the candidates. They should also help direct students to their seats and prohibit the entrance of forbidden items such as mobile phones, smart watch, headphones, portable audio/video/gaming devices and textbooks at the examination hall.

During the exam
During the examination, all exam invigilators must give their whole attention to the examination process. At this time, they must be vigilant, mobile and attentive and should not perform any other tasks throughout the examination’s duration.

At this time, exam invigilators must respond to queries from candidates immediately and assist the candidates as per their needs. Within the first 30 minutes of the examination, the invigilators should take the attendance of the candidates in the attendance record sheet and sign it before submitting it to the Chief Invigilator. While checking the attendance, they must also check the candidate's name, candidate number, passport, admit card or examination entrance card etc.

Exam invigilators must deal with students who arrive late at the examination venue and record their attendance and consult with the Chief Invigilator to determine whether extra time will be granted to such candidates or not.

Invigilators must not permit candidates to leave the examination hall room during the first 1-hour and the last 15 minutes of the examination. They should also take immediate actions in case of candidates caught cheating during the examination and report to the Chief Invigilator. If unauthorized materials are found inside the examination hall, they should remove them immediately. In the event of an emergency or fire alarm, invigilators should follow the  emergency exit procedures and lead the candidates safely outside the examination hall.

Invigilators must be as quiet as possible during the examination duration but also remain vigilant to the candidates. They should not explain any questions asked by the candidates or allow any other person to ask questions of, or read answers to, the candidates.

After the exam
After the examination is over, the exam invigilators should collect the scripts, question papers, stationery and other reference booklets from the candidates and check that all the required information (name, candidate number, venue, date etc.) have been filled out by the candidates on their scripts properly. When all the scripts are collected, invigilators should release candidates and direct them towards the exit of the examination hall in complete silence.

E-proctoring 
E-proctoring, also known as remote proctoring, is a form of exam proctoring which involves monitoring student behaviour during exams administered electronically, including those given as part of e-learning or remote learning.

Concerns about the use of commercial e-proctoring services include the non-functionality of the software; it mostly fails to identify any actual fraud, while it can falsely flag innocent students for suspicious behavior. It violates students' privacy, security, and impact to students' mental health. Additionally, it is prone to technical issues that can negatively impact students' exam performance.

There is clear evidence to that it is easily possible to circumvent e-proctoring software. A scientific test of the Proctorio software at the Dutch University of Twente showed that the software was not able to detect any of the cases of examination fraud it was subjected to. The conclusion was that the sensitivity of Proctorio should be considered at very close to zero.  In addition, there have been multiple reports of user data from commercial e-proctoring services being hacked, resulting in thousands of colleges' and hundreds of thousands of users' data being released.

Controversy 
Controversy over e-proctoring escalated during the COVID-19 pandemic, when many universities, K–12 schools, and standardized testing organizations turned to commercial e-proctoring suppliers for services. Students across the world protested the use of commercial e-proctoring services at their post-secondary institutions. It has been noted that online proctoring technologies use algorithms that discriminate against students of darker skin tones, including Black students and other persons of colour.

Proctorio lawsuits 
In 2020, e-proctoring software company Proctorio sued a university employee at the University of British Columbia over alleged breach of copyright. The employee was critical of Proctorio on social media and posted links to unlisted YouTube videos produced by the company.  A court ruling on the case was published on 15 June 2021 and another on 11 March 2022, dismissing the case. As of late 2022, the employee is appealing the dismissal.

In 2020 a computer engineering student at a different collage publicly shared excerpts of code installed by Proctorio on their personal computer. The student sued Proctorio after they had the material removed. Proctorio countersued arguing copyright infringement and defamation. The case was settled out of court.

Class-action lawsuits were brought up against Proctorio and two other companies. The companies were accused of failing to provide legally required data retention and destruction policies and failing to obtain consent for gathering biometric information. The lawsuit against Proctorio was dismissed by a judge in August 2022.

References

Bibliography 
 320, Withheld. "How to Be a School Exam Invigilator." Career Path 360. N.p., 23 June 2009. Web. 10 July 2014. 
 "The Exam Cycle : Invigilation." Department for Education. National College for Teaching & Leadership, 10 April 2014. Web. 6 July 2014.
 Guardian, The. "What I'm Really Thinking: The Exam Invigilator." The Guardian. Guardian News and Media, 14 July 2012. Web. 10 July 2014. 
 Invigilators, Express. "Express Invigilators-Role." Express Invigilators – Role. N.p., n.d. Web. 10 July 2014. 
 "Invigilator." The Free Dictionary. Farlex, n.d. Web. 6 July 2014.
 "Job Title: Examination Invigilator." The Ridgeway School (2012): 1–2. Eteach. The Ridgeway School, June 2012. Web. 6 July 2014.
 Kumar, BC. "Invigilator – English Language Tutorials." English Language Tutorials. Web Learn Eng, n.d. Web. 10 July 2014.
 Laurent Pascale. British Council Invigilators – Code of Practice. Brussels: Laurent Pascale, (n.d). British Council Belgium. British Council. Web. 6 July 2014.
 "Main Navigation." Invigilators FAQs. Cambridge International Examinations, n.d. Web. 6 July 2014.
 McMahon, Mary, and Kristen Osborne. "What Does an Invigilator Do?" WiseGeek. Conjecture, 5 June 2014. Web. 10 July 2014.

Education and training occupations